The Turing Foundation is a Dutch charitable organization, based in Amsterdam, The Netherlands. 

The Turing Foundation, named in honour of scientist Alan Turing, was established in 2006 by Pieter Geelen, who donated the €100 million he acquired from the IPO of TomTom, a company he co-founded. 

The foundation contributes roughly €3,500,000 a year to projects that:

 provide education for children in developing countries, 
 protect and conserve nature, 
 fight leprosy, and
 allow people to enjoy art.

References

External links
 Turing Foundation website 

2006 establishments in the Netherlands
Organizations established in 2006
Development charities based in the Netherlands
Foundations based in the Netherlands
Organisations based in Amsterdam
Alan Turing